The 1926 VFL Grand Final was an Australian rules football game contested between the Melbourne Football Club and Collingwood Football Club, held at the Melbourne Cricket Ground in Melbourne on 9 October 1926. It was the 28th annual Grand Final of the Victorian Football League, staged to determine the premiers for the 1926 VFL season. The match, attended by 59,632 spectators, was won by Melbourne by a margin of 57 points, marking that club's second premiership victory and their first since 1900.

Background

Throughout the premiership season, Collingwood would finish on top of the ladder with an 15-3 record to win their 8th minor premiership with them defeating  in the final round by 47 points to cement their spot on top by 4.1% over defending champions Geelong. In the semi-final, they took on third place  on the 25 September. After opening up a 22 point lead at the half, they would concede eight goals in the third quarter to bring Melbourne back into the match and would later go on to lose the match to the Demons by 11 points. Despite the loss, they advanced to the grand final as the minor premiers.

Melbourne had been eliminated in the preliminary final in the previous season to Collingwood and was trying to go one better than they did in the previous season. The team finished third on the table with an 14-4 record which meant they took on Collingwood. An eight goal third quarter set up the victory for Melbourne as they won by 11 points. Though due to the challenge round system they had to compete in a preliminary final, the following week against fourth place  who had defeated Geelong in the other semi-final. Scores in the preliminary final was affected due to strong gusty winds that blew through the stadium. In what The Age described as a 'desperate and exciting finishes to the season', Melbourne held on to win by 3 points.

Teams
Heading into the match, Melbourne made two changes to the side that defeated Essendon with Bob Corbett being replaced by Francis Vine after Corbett fractured his jaw during the match. The other change was the dropping of Ossie Green for Harry Coy. Collingwood also made two changes to their lineup that loss to Melbourne with Charlie Dibbs and George Clayden being replaced in the lineup for Ernie Wilson and Charlie Milburn.

 Umpires - Jack McMurray (field), Naismith (boundary), Davies (boundary), Jenkins (goal), Rouvray (goal).

Match Summary

Scoreboard

References

See also
 1926 VFL season

VFL/AFL Grand Finals
Grand
Melbourne Football Club
Collingwood Football Club
October 1926 sports events